This is a list of Estonian television related events from 1985.

Events

Debuts

Television shows

Ending this year

Births
20 May - Marta Laan, actress
12 June - Liisa Pulk, actress
23 August – Juss Haasma, actor
26 September – Lenna Kuurmaa, singer-songwriter and actress

Deaths